Kuts is a surname. Notable people with the surname include:

 Vladimir Kuts (1927–1975), Soviet long-distance runner
 Vladimir Kuts (soldier) (1927–2022), Soviet soldier

See also
 KUTS
 Kutz (disambiguation)